The 2014 MAVTV 500 IndyCar World Championships was the 18th and final race of the 2014 IndyCar Series season. The event took place on August 30, at the 2.000-mile (3.219 km) Auto Club Speedway in Fontana, California.

Report
Hélio Castroneves of Team Penske won the pole position with a speed of 218.540 mph, the 41st pole of his career. Castroneves' teammate, Will Power, entered the race with the points lead and started 21st.

Tony Kanaan of Chip Ganassi Racing won his first race of the season, while his teammate, Scott Dixon, finished second. Power finished ninth and thus locked up the championship.

Kanaan's average speed was a record for a 500-mile race at Auto Club Speedway, and in two of the three Fuzzy's Triple Crown races in 2014, a new race record was set at the race in 2014.

References

MAVTV 500 IndyCar World Championships
MAVTV 500
MAVTV 500 IndyCar World Championships
MAVTV 500 IndyCar World Championships